Joseph Henry 'Harry' Falcon (9 April 1892 – 11 February 1950) was an English first-class cricketer.

The son of Michael Falcon and his wife, Isabella Falcon (née Mordy), he was born at of Horstead House in Norfolk. He was educated at Harrow School,  before going up to Pembroke College, Cambridge. While at Cambridge, he made two appearances in first-class cricket for Cambridge University against Sussex and the Marylebone Cricket Club. He took 5 wickets in his two matches, with best figures of 3 for 72. He played minor counties cricket for Norfolk before the First World War, making seven appearances in the Minor Counties Championship from 1911–14. 

Falcon served in the war with the 1st East Anglian Regiment, enlisting as a second lieutenant in August 1914. He was made a temporary lieutenant in May 1915, with full promotion to the rank coming in June 1916. He was made an acting captain in August 1917, while second in command of a battalion, with full promotion to the rank coming in August 1918. Following the conclusiono of the war, he was made an acting major in February 1919, relinquishing the appointment in June 1919. 

He resumed playing minor counties for Norfolk after the war, making an additional fourteen appearances in the Minor Counties Championship from 1920–24. He died suddenly at Lowestoft in February 1950. His brother, Michael, was also a first-class cricketer.

References

External links

1892 births
1950 deaths
People from Broadland (district)
People educated at Harrow School
Alumni of Pembroke College, Cambridge
English cricketers
Norfolk cricketers
Cambridge University cricketers
British Army personnel of World War I
Suffolk Regiment officers